St. Joseph's University, New York (SJNY, SJU or St. Joe's) is a private Catholic university in New York State, with campuses in Brooklyn and Long Island. The university provides education at the undergraduate and graduate levels, offering degrees in more than 54 majors, special course offerings and certificates, affiliated and pre-professional programs.

History 

Originally named St. Joseph's College for Women, the college was founded by the Sisters of St. Joseph of Brentwood under the leaders of their superior Mother Mary Louis in response to the need for a day college for young women. It is the only historical women's college in the borough of Brooklyn, NY. SJC received its provisional charter from the Regents of the University of the State of New York on February 24, 1916. After the college outgrew its original Brooklyn facilities at 286 Washington Avenue, it moved to its present site at 245 Clinton Avenue in 1918. The college's first baccalaureate degrees were conferred on fourteen graduates on June 17, 1920, and the first valedictorian was Beverly Stubbenhouser. The college was accredited in 1928 by the Middle States Commission on Higher Education. The regents granted St. Joseph's College an absolute charter in 1929. Reverend William T. Dillon, J.D., professor of philosophy, served as dean of the college and later its president. St. Joseph's opened a laboratory preschool, the Dillon Child Study Center, in 1934 following several years of research in the field of child development. S. Vincent Thérèse Tuohy assumed the presidency in 1956. McEntegart Hall, a multi-functional building housing the library and classrooms, opened in 1965.

Sister George Aquin O'Connor was elected president and assumed responsibility on July 1, 1969. In 1970, a Charter amendment changed the name to St. Joseph's College and enabled the college to admit the first male students to full matriculation. On February 2, 1971, St. Joseph's inaugurated an extension program in the collegiate center formerly known as Brentwood College, and moved to develop a degree program in Brentwood, oriented to the third and fourth years of college. This Upper Division baccalaureate program opened in September 1972, and the Board of Regents of the State of New York authorized St. Joseph's College to join Long Island University C.W. Post Campus, in a Coordinate Campus program, the first such pattern adopted in the State. In 1976, this Suffolk County operation was authorized by the Regents to operate as a branch campus. In 1978, St. Joseph's College expanded its operation at the Suffolk Branch Campus to a full four-year program, and in 1979 moved to a 25-acre campus in Patchogue which includes a baseball field, two multi-story buildings that house classrooms, a multi-story research library, and a modern athletic facility that includes a convertible indoor sport floor, an indoor swimming pool, fully equipped weight rooms and several other offerings.

Since then, the Long Island Campus has expanded to include the Clare Rose Playhouse, the Callahan Library, the John A. Danzi Athletic Center, the 33,000-square-foot Business Technology Center, and most recently, the 24.8 acre, outdoor athletic facility. 
The Brooklyn Campus has expanded as well with the purchase of a five-story brownstone for staff and faculty office space, the purchase of St. Angela Hall Academy for additional classrooms, and plans for further expansion over the next 10 years, including a new athletic facility.

In April 2022, the New York State Board of Regents approved the name change from St. Joseph's College to St. Joseph's University.

Student life

Greek life 
Greek Life at St. Joseph's University - Long Island is administered by the Office of Student Life and directly by the Greek Council of St. Joseph's University - Long Island. Currently, St. Joseph's University - Long Island has 6 Greek social organizations.

 Sororities:
 Alpha Theta Rho (local)
 Alpha Gamma Delta (Lambda Alpha chapter)
 Kappa Beta Gamma (Alpha Delta chapter)
 Theta Phi Alpha (Delta Beta chapter)
Delta Phi Epsilon (Gamma Phi chapter)
 Fraternities:
 Alpha Phi Delta (Epsilon Gamma chapter) 
 Delta Kappa Epsilon (Sigma Xi chapter)

Athletics

St. Joseph's–Long Island Golden Eagles 
St. Joseph's–Long Island athletic teams are the Golden Eagles. The campus is a member of the Division III level of the National Collegiate Athletic Association (NCAA), primarily competing in the Skyline Conference since the 1999–2000 academic year.

St. Joseph's–Long Island competes in 16 intercollegiate varsity sports: Men's sports include baseball, basketball, cross country, golf, lacrosse, soccer, tennis & volleyball; while women's sports include basketball, cross country, golf, lacrosse, men's and women's soccer, softball, tennis & volleyball.

The Long Island Campus of St. Joseph's University has a 24.8 acre, outdoor sports facility, which are now home to their baseball, softball, lacrosse, soccer and tennis teams.

St. Joseph's–Brooklyn Bears 
St. Joseph's–Brooklyn athletic teams are the Bears. The campus is a member of the Division III level of the National Collegiate Athletic Association (NCAA), primarily competing in the Skyline Conference since the 2015–16 academic year.

Prior joining to the NCAA, they were previously a member of the United States Collegiate Athletic Association (USCAA), and competed in the following athletic conferences: the Hudson Valley Men's Athletic Conference (HVMAC) for men's sports; and the Hudson Valley Women's Athletic Conference (HVWAC) for women's sports.

St. Joseph's–Brooklyn competes in 13 intercollegiate varsity sports: Men's sports include baseball, basketball, cross country, soccer, tennis & volleyball; while women's sports include basketball, cross country, soccer, softball, swimming, tennis & volleyball.

Academics 

St. Joseph’s University offers degrees in over 50 majors, special course offerings and certificates, affiliated and pre-professional programs through its School of Arts and Sciences and its School of Professional and Graduate Studies, as well as 21 graduate degrees. The university has 3,774 undergraduate students and 913 graduate students as of Fall 2021. SJU has seen 9% enrollment declines since 2019. Only 25% of faculty are full-time, while the average for institutions offering master's and bachelor's degrees is 50%.

Admission
Approximately 71% of applicants were admitted in 2020. The SAT average is 1100, placing the student body at the 59th percentile of examinees. The enrollment yield is 20.2%, indicating that 20.2% of students admitted actually choose to attend SJU. The larger Patchogue campus fills a niche market in central Long Island juxtaposed against elite Stony Brook to the North and other large research institutions like Hofstra University to the West. It relies heavily on Suffolk County Community College for transfer students.

Rankings
SJU is not nationally ranked by US News or Times Higher Education. Within US News regional rankings, SJU ranks at the 55th percentile out of 175 total schools.

SJU Online is ranked by US News at the 58th percentile for online bachelor's degrees out of 383 total schools, and offers 27 bachelor, master, and certificate programs online. SJU Online is ranked 14th of 22 total NY schools in the online rankings.

Tuition
SJUs tuition for Fall 2021 was $31,760 per year, substantially higher than the NY state average for in-state students of $7,186.

References

External links 

 
 St. Joseph's-Long Island Golden Eagles official athletics website
 St. Joseph's-Brooklyn Bears official athletics website

 
Universities and colleges in New York City
Universities and colleges on Long Island
Educational institutions established in 1916
USCAA member institutions
Universities and colleges in Suffolk County, New York
Universities and colleges in Brooklyn
Catholic universities and colleges in New York (state)
Former women's universities and colleges in the United States
Sisters of Saint Joseph colleges and universities
1916 establishments in New York City